Aureimonas ureilytica is a bacterium from the genus of Aurantimonas. Aurantimonas ureilytica was reclassified to Aureimonas ureilytica.

References

External links
Type strain of Aureimonas ureilytica at BacDive -  the Bacterial Diversity Metadatabase

 

Hyphomicrobiales
Bacteria described in 2011